Colonel James Lowther (23 February 1753 – 1837) was a British soldier and Tory politician who sat in the House of Commons for 43 years from 1775 to 1818.

He was the second son of Rev. Henry Lowther, rector of Aikton, and Dorothy Tatham. Rev. Henry was the great-grandson of Rev. Lancelot Lowther, rector of Long Marston and son of Sir Christopher Lowther (1557–1617). Rev. Lancelot founded the cadet branch of Lowther of Colby Leathes, the heads of which family were largely clerics with livings in the gift of the more senior branches of the Lowther family.

James, however, took a more active role in the service of his fourth cousin, James Lowther, 1st Earl of Lonsdale. As one of "Lord Lonsdale's ninepins", he was member of parliament for Westmorland from 1775 until 1812, and then for Appleby from 1812 until 1818. He was also returned for Haslemere in 1790, but preferred to continue to sit for Westmorland. In addition to his political role, Lowther served as second to Lord Lonsdale in two notable duels, the first in June 1792 with an officer of the Life Guards, and the second in 1796 with Sir Frederick Fletcher-Vane, 2nd Baronet.

Lowther was for some time the commander of the Royal Cumberland Militia. In 1798, he was transferred to command the Royal Westmorland Militia, and was commissioned a colonel in the regular Army when that regiment was embodied.

He died in Caen, Normandy in the summer of 1837.

References

External links 
 

1753 births
1837 deaths
Border Regiment officers
British Militia officers
Members of the Parliament of Great Britain for English constituencies
Members of the Parliament of the United Kingdom for English constituencies
UK MPs 1801–1802
UK MPs 1802–1806
UK MPs 1806–1807
UK MPs 1807–1812
UK MPs 1812–1818
British MPs 1774–1780
British MPs 1780–1784
British MPs 1784–1790
British MPs 1790–1796
British MPs 1796–1800
Members of the Parliament of the United Kingdom for Appleby